Baltej Singh (born 4 November 1990) is an Indian cricketer who plays for Punjab. He made his Twenty20 debut on 2 January 2016 in the 2015–16 Syed Mushtaq Ali Trophy. In February 2022, he was bought by the Punjab Kings in the auction for the 2022 Indian Premier League tournament.

References

External links
 

1990 births
Living people
Indian cricketers
Punjab, India cricketers
Cricketers from Ludhiana